The GNU Simpler Free Documentation License (GSFDL) is a proposed version of the GNU Free Documentation License (GFDL) that has no requirements to maintain Cover Texts and Invariant Sections. It is meant to provide a simpler licensing option for authors who do not wish to use these features in the GFDL.

The GSFDL is a copyleft license for free content, designed by the Free Software Foundation (FSF) for the GNU project. This license is currently only in draft form (published September 26, 2006).  The draft is mostly identical to the current Version 2 draft of the GNU Free Documentation License, except it makes no provision for Cover Texts and Invariant Sections; and it includes a new section 0a entitled "Free Manuals are Essential" which contains an ideological statement.  

The GFDLv2 explicitly allows cross licensing to the GSFDL for any work that does not use any of the features that the GSFDL does not support.

The license was designed for manuals, textbooks, other reference and instructional materials, and documentation which often accompanies GPL software. However, it can be used for any work, regardless of subject matter or medium (although it is not recommended for use in software).

See also
BSD Documentation License
Share-alike

External links
 First Discussion draft

Free content licenses
Free Software Foundation